Gregory Pokie (born 29 July 1987) is a Surinamese professional footballer who plays as a midfielder for SVB Eerste Divisie club Broki.

Club career
Pokie had a lengthy spell with Inter Moengotapoe from 2009 to 2017, and also played for FCS National and Botopasi before joining WBC. In the 2015–16 season, he was voted Surinamese Footballer of the Year, becoming the first Saramaccan player and the first from Brownsweg to win the trophy.

International career
On 22 April 2009, Pokie made his debut for Suriname in a 0–0 friendly draw against French Guiana. He would go on to earn a total of 23 caps, scoring one goal.

International goals
Scores and results list Suriname's goal tally first.

Honours 
Inter Moengotapoe

 SVB Eerste Divisie: 2009–10, 2010–11, 2012–13, 2013–14, 2014–15, 2015–16, 2016–17
 SVB Cup: 2011–12, 2016–17
 Suriname President's Cup: 2010, 2011, 2012, 2013

References

External links
 

1987 births
Living people
People from Brokopondo District
Association football midfielders
Surinamese footballers
Suriname international footballers
FCS Nacional players
Inter Moengotapoe players
S.V. Walking Boyz Company players
S.V. Broki players
SVB Eerste Divisie players
Suriname under-20 international footballers